María Remedios del Valle (ca. 1768–1847) also known as the "Madre de la Patria" (Mother of the Homeland) was an Afro-Argentine camp follower turned soldier who participated in the Argentine War of Independence. Wounded in battle, captured, imprisoned and escaped, she lost her entire family during the war. When the war ended, she returned to Buenos Aires and eventually turned to begging. Discovered by one of the generals under whom she had fought, she was approved for a pension which was paid over the last decade of her life. Largely forgotten until the turn of the 21st century, when Argentine historians began including the contributions of black Argentines, she is now widely recognized for her contributions to the independence of the nation. The Argentine legislature declared 8 November as the National Day of Afro-Argentines and African Culture in 2013.

Early life
María Remedios del Valle was born in Buenos Aires, Argentina and was listed in her military records as a parda, a term formerly applied to triracial descendants of Europeans, Indigenous Americans, and West African slaves, that later became applied to people of mostly or entirely African descent. Testimony given in the 1828 Diario de Sesiones, a Congressional record, states that she was "sixty or more years old", placing her birth around 1768.

Career
María Remedios del Valle, with her husband and two sons, accompanied the Army of the North, which had been deployed by the United Provinces of the Río de la Plata to liberate Peru and Upper Peru, now Bolivia from Spain. This was the first military expedition to the interior and left Buenos Aires on 20 June 1810 under the command of  captain of the Volante Artillery Battalion's 6th Company. Initially, del Valle was among the rabonas, or camp followers, who were recruited from the urban poor and rural peasantry to follow the troops and provide cooking and nursing services, carry arms and munitions, and gather intelligence which could assist the military. 

The army arrived in December 1810 at Potosí. Del Valle's participation in the battles of "Huaqui (20 June 1811) and the army's subsequent retreat to Jujuy, the exodus from Jujuy (23 August 1812), the victories at Tucumán (24 September 1812) and Salta (20 February 1813), and the defeats at Vilcapugio (1 October 1813) and Ayohuma (14 November 1813)" were recorded. Prior to the Battle of Tucumán, she sought permission from General Manuel Belgrano to tend the troops who had fallen in the front lines. Belgrano denied permission, on the grounds that women were not suited for duty at the front. Ignoring his order, del Valle proceeded with her plan and was later recognized by Belgrano with the rank of captain in the army. During the Battle of Ayohuma, del Valle was wounded when she was shot by the enemy and taken as prisoner by the Spanish forces. During her captivity, she assisted several prisoners in escapes and was sentenced to be publicly flogged for nine consecutive days. She eventually escaped and returned to the army to assist with the battlefield wounded, remaining through the end of the conflict.

Little is known of del Valle's history after the war ended in 1818, until around 1826. It is known that her husband and two children were killed in the conflicts, though which specific actions is unclear. On 23 October 1826, she applied for compensation for services rendered by her family during the Argentine War of Independence, but her claim was denied. Poor health and age limited her ability to provide for herself, and del Valle began begging for food at convents in the city. General Juan José Viamonte discovered her in the streets in a deplorable condition and petitioned the legislature on her behalf to provide her with a pension. With the support of other generals, such as Anzoátegui, who was then a captain; General Eustaquio Díaz Vélez, who testified she served as a guerrilla fighter, as well as provider of aid to the wounded; and Colonel Hipólito Videla, who confirmed del Valle had been wounded and imprisoned at Ayohuma. An examination of del Valle's body confirmed that she had six scars evidencing she had been wounded by bullets and swords.

Tomás de Anchorena, a member of the legislature also presented a case in her defense and the legislature agreed grant del Valle a salary for the rank of captain of the infantry. This was later elevated to compensation as a sergeant major of the cavalry. Del Valle was placed in inactive status, with full salary corresponding to her rank in 1830. She continued receiving a pension until her death in 1847, though records show that between 1836 and 1847, payment was made to Remedios Rosas.

Death and legacy

A note dated 8 November 1847 in the military archives pension records indicates Rosas had died. She first appeared in a history book in Argentina in the early 1930s, when Carlos Ibarguren published her story and in 1944 Buenos Aires named a street in her honour. However, she was largely forgotten until the beginning of the 21st century, when Afro-Argentines, activists and scholars began to include the history of people who had been left out of the historiography of the country because of deliberate discrimination based on gender and race. She is now widely recognized for her contributions and numerous publications have retold her story. Since 2013, 8 November is celebrated in her honor, as the National Day of Afro-Argentines and African Culture.

On 8 November 2022, a monument to María Remedios del Valle was unveiled on Plazoleta Castelao, in Buenos Aires. The monument included a statue in del Valle's image sculpted by Alexis Minkiewicz, in collaboration with Gisela Kraisman and Louis Yupanki.

References

Citations

Bibliography

 

1768 births
1847 deaths
Afro-Argentine people
People from Buenos Aires
People of the Argentine War of Independence
Women in war in South America
Women in 19th-century warfare